Run Away Home is a 1997 book by Patricia McKissack. Set in the late 19th century, it is about an African-American girl, Sarah Jane, who finds an Apache boy in the family barn and the subsequent affects on their lives.

Reception
School Library Journal, in a review of Run Away Home, wrote "Grabbing readers with wonderful characters, an engaging plot, and vital themes, McKissack weaves a compelling story of cultural clash, tragedy, accommodation, and ultimate triumph." while Booklist found it a "generally fast-paced story flags occasionally when information-heavy dialogue intrudes." and concluded "The happy ending ties things up too neatly, but this story is fine for the undemanding reader who wants an old-fashioned, feel-good saga."

Run Away Home has also been reviewed by Publishers Weekly, and The Horn Book Magazine.

Awards
1997 CCBC Choice
1999-2000 Young Hoosier Intermediate (4-6) Award - nominee
2000 NCTE Adventuring with Books: A Booklist for Pre-K to Grade 6
2001 NCTE Kaleidoscope: A Multicultural Booklist for Grades K-8

References

1997 children's books
American children's books
Books by Patricia McKissack